Khairi is a village of Tehsil Mirpur, It is split into Upper Khairi and Lower Khairi and has the population of around 300. The surrounding villages are called Sarthalla, Mehra and Muri.

Populated places in Mirpur District